Christian Emeka Okoye (born August 16, 1961) is a Nigerian-American former American football running back for the Kansas City Chiefs from 1987 to 1992. Nicknamed "the Nigerian Nightmare", he is known for his powerful running style and ability to break tackles. His six-season NFL career produced an NFL rushing champion title in 1989, first-team All-Pro honors in 1989, second-team All-Pro honors in 1991, two Pro Bowl appearances in 1989 and 1991, and three playoff appearances. He ended his NFL career due to multiple injuries. He was inducted into the Kansas City Chiefs Hall of Fame in 2000. He is also notable for not having ever played football until the age of 23, but later leading the NFL in rushing at age 28.

College career
A member of the Igbo ethnic group, Okoye was born in Enugu, Nigeria. He arrived in the US at age 21 and did not play American football until age 23, when he joined the squad at California's Azusa Pacific University. He excelled in track and field, winning seven college titles in the shot put, discus, and hammer throw. The first time he attended an American football game he thought the game was boring.

After the Nigerian government declined Okoye for the Olympics in track and field, he sought other activities and went out for American football. Initially, he did not enjoy the roughness of football and considered quitting but friends convinced him to continue playing. His speed (4.45-seconds in the 40-yard dash) was unusual for someone his size (6'1" and 260 lbs), and this rare combination of talents led to his selection by the Kansas City Chiefs in the second round of the 1987 NFL Draft.

Professional career
In his rookie year, Okoye rushed for 660 yards on 157 carries. The following year, a thumb injury limited him to nine games, and he finished the season with 473 yards.

In 1989, Okoye had his best NFL season statistics by far, leading the league in both rushing attempts (370) and rushing yards (1,480), becoming the first Chiefs player to lead the NFL in rushing. Though the Chiefs missed the playoffs, Okoye was selected by UPI as the American Football Conference's Offensive Player of the Year and earned entry to the Pro Bowl in Hawaii.

The remainder of Okoye's career was marked by a nagging knee injury, which limited him to 805 yards and a 3.3 yard average per carry in 1990. Though his 1991 performance (1,031 yards and 4.6 yards per carry) earned him his second Pro Bowl appearance, his carries in 1992 were largely limited to goal-line situations. His last carry as a professional football running back was an 8-yard touchdown.

On August 25, 1993, Chiefs placed him on injured reserve before the regular season began due to knee injuries. He underwent surgeries on both knees and was released on an injury settlement that September. He went home to California to continue rehabilitating his knee. He intended to work out for other teams before ultimately retiring. He has stated that he ended his NFL career because he became tired of practice, and that he considered football to be a job.

Okoye retired as the all-time rushing leader of the Chiefs, having amassed 4,897 yards, 1,246 attempts, and 14 games with at least 100 yards rushing, in his six seasons. Those team records have since been surpassed by Priest Holmes.  His 40 career rushing touchdowns as a member of the Chiefs trail only Holmes and Marcus Allen. His Chiefs records for carries in a game and rushing attempts in a season were surpassed by Larry Johnson. Okoye was the team MVP in 1989, and was enshrined in the Chiefs Hall of Fame in 2000.

Okoye is well known in video gaming for his appearance in Tecmo Super Bowl (1991), in which he's nearly impossible to tackle.

NFL career statistics

Post-NFL career
Okoye was an investor in the Golden Baseball League and owned Okoye Health and Fitness, a company that sells nutritional supplements. He appeared as a boxer on the FX Network's Celebrity Boxing special.  He founded the California Sports Hall of Fame
of which he is president.

He appeared on the CBS reality show Pirate Master and was voted off by his shipmates on the second episode for his slow speed in the Expedition, receiving no gold. He appeared on Pros vs Joes in its third season.

The Christian Okoye Foundation sponsors the Ontario Mills 5K and 10K race, benefiting local after-school athletic programs in the Inland Empire.

Personal life
As a child in Nigeria, Okoye became good friends with Olympian Innocent Egbunike. When Innocent began attending Azusa, he recommended Okoye on discus ability, to track and field coaches who offered Okoye a scholarship.

Okoye married his college sweetheart Lauren Brown in 1990, and divorced in 1996. They had two children together, Michael Emeka Okoye born July 12, 1990, who died shortly after birth due to neonatal asphyxia, and Tiana Chinwe Okoye born August 26, 1991.

Okoye has given his “blessing” to former UFC Champion Kamaru Usman to use Okoye's trademarked name “The Nigerian Nightmare”.

References

External links

 The Christian Okoye Foundation
 

1961 births
Living people
American football running backs
Azusa Pacific Cougars football players
Kansas City Chiefs players
College men's track and field athletes in the United States
American Conference Pro Bowl players
Players of American football from Enugu State
Nigerian players of American football
Igbo sportspeople
Participants in American reality television series
Ed Block Courage Award recipients